Anne Hathaway (born 1982) is an American actress and singer.

Anne Hathaway may also refer to:
Anne Hathaway (wife of Shakespeare) (1556–1623)
"Anne Hathaway" (poem), a poem by Carol Ann Duffy
Portrait of Anne Hathaway
Mary Bigelow Ingham (1832–1923), American author who used the pen name Anne Hathaway

See also
Anne Hathaway's Cottage, a restored cottage in which Shakespeare's wife lived

Hathaway, Anne